Maja Gunvor Erlandsen (born 11 October 1989) is a Norwegian freestyle wrestler. In 2012, she won the gold medal in the 72 kg event at the 2012 European Wrestling Championships held in Belgrade, Serbia. In the final she defeated Kateryna Burmistrova of Ukraine. A few months after winning the medal she decided to end her wrestling career and she joined the Norwegian Armed Forces.

Major results

References

External links 
 

Living people
1989 births
Place of birth missing (living people)
Norwegian female sport wrestlers
European Wrestling Championships medalists
21st-century Norwegian women